École nationale supérieure en génie des technologies industrielles (formerly École supérieure d’ingénieurs en génie des technologies industrielles) a French engineering college created in 1991.

The school trains engineers with a multidisciplinary profile, who work in all sectors of industry and services.

Located in Pau, Pyrénées-Atlantiques, the ENSGTI is a public higher education institution. The school is a member of the Toulouse Tech.

References

External links
 ENSGTI

Engineering universities and colleges in France
Pau, Pyrénées-Atlantiques
ENSGTI
Educational institutions established in 1991
1991 establishments in France